Smed is a Danish occupational surname meaning "smith". Notable people with this surname include:

 Esben Smed (b. 1984), Danish actor
 Lis Smed (1914–1944), Danish actress
 Peer Smed (1878–1943), Danish-American silversmith

Danish-language surnames